Ramachandra Krishnaji Phatak (October 21, 1917 – September 26, 2002), also known as Ram Phatak, was a Marathi music composer and singer.  His famous compositions include several songs by Bhimsen Joshi and Sudhir Phadke
.

Notes

References 
 

Marathi-language singers
1917 births
2002 deaths
20th-century Indian composers
Indian male composers
20th-century Indian male singers
20th-century Indian singers